Ognevia is a genus of spur-throated grasshoppers in the family Acrididae. There are at least three described species in Ognevia, found in Asia.

Species
These species belong to the genus Ognevia:
 Ognevia longipennis (Shiraki, 1910)
 Ognevia sergii Ikonnikov, 1911
 Ognevia taiwanensis Yin, Zhi & Ye, 2015

References

External links

 

Acrididae